Mardy A.F.C. was a Welsh football team that played in the Southern League in the 1910s and 1920s. They were based in the village of Maerdy, Glamorgan.

They joined the Southern League (Division Two) for the 1911–12 season, but left at the end of 1913–14. After World War I they rejoined the league in 1919–20 and the following season their league was renamed as the Welsh Section. Their last full season in the league was 1921–22, as after starting the 1922–23 season their record was expunged.

Mardy generally finished towards the bottom of the table in their seasons in the league. After the First Division sides left the league in 1920 to join The Football League Mardy continued to struggle, finishing in the bottom two for the next two seasons.

Former Mardy players include Jack Cartmell, John Goodall and Proctor Hall.

References

External links
Southern League finishing positions by club, 1894–95 to 1919–20

Defunct football clubs in Wales
Southern Football League clubs
Sport in Glamorgan